Luigi Mozzi (born at Bergamo 26 May 1746; died near Milan 24 June 1813) was an Italian Jesuit controversialist.

Life

He entered the Society of Jesus in 1763, and on its suppression was received into the Diocese of Bergamo, where he was shortly made a canon, and appointed archpriest and examiner of candidates for the priesthood. The zeal with which he opposed the progress of Jansenism in Italy gained him a reputation, and Pope Pius VI called him to Rome, where he became an Apostolic missionary. 

He was elected a member of the Accademia degli Arcadi. In 1804 he rejoined the Society, which had been restored in Naples. He retired to the residence of Marquis Scotti near Milan, where he died.

Works

Among his important writings are: 

"Vera idea del Giansenismo" (1781)
"Storia compendiosa dello scisma della nuova chiesa d'Utrecht" (Ferrara, 1785)
"Storia delle revoluzioni della Chiesa d'Utrecht" (Venice, 1787)
"Compendio storico-cronologico...sopra il Baianismo, Giansenismo e Quesnellismo" (Foligno, 1792), 

all against Jansenism; 

"Il falso discepolo di S. Agostino e di S. Tommaso" (Venice, 1779), a defence of Molinism. 

He translated from the English Anthony Ulrich, Duke of Brunswick-Wolfenbüttel's "Fifty Reasons for preferring the Roman Catholic Religion" (Bassano, 1789); and from the French, "Les projets des incredules pour la ruine de la religion, dévoilés dans les oeuvres de Frédéric, roi de Prusse" (Assisi, 1791).

References
Hugo von Hurter, Nomenclator, III, 540
Vita del P.L. Mozzi (Novara, 1823).

1746 births
1813 deaths
18th-century Italian Jesuits
Clergy from Bergamo